If You Want Blood You've Got It (written as just If You Want Blood) is the first live album by Australian hard rock band AC/DC, and their only live album with Bon Scott as lead vocalist. It was originally released in the UK and Europe on 13 October 1978, in the US on 21 November 1978, and in Australia on 27 November 1978. The album was re-released in 1994 on Atco Records and in 2003 as part of the AC/DC Remasters series.

Background
The album was released six months after the band's previous studio album Powerage. A 'best-of' package called 12 of the Best had been in the works, but the project was scrapped in favour of a live album. It was recorded during the 1978 Powerage tour and contains songs from T.N.T., Dirty Deeds Done Dirt Cheap, Let There Be Rock, and Powerage. It is the last Bon Scott-era AC/DC album produced by Harry Vanda and George Young, who also produced the band's first five studio releases.

In his 1994 Bon Scott memoir Highway to Hell, author Clinton Walker observes, "Live albums, which tended to be double or triple sets in which songs short in their studio versions were stretched out into extended tedium, were for some reason popular in the seventies. If You Want Blood reversed this tradition... it boasted a blunt ten tracks and, allowing nothing extraneous, got straight to the point, that being raging AC/DC rock and roll."

A concert at the Apollo Theatre in Glasgow, Scotland on 30 April 1978 was used for the live tracks. It has never been confirmed if any other tracks from the tour were also used. The concert is also remembered for the encore, when AC/DC came back on stage dressed in the Scottish football strip, paying homage to Scott's and the Young brothers' homeland. 

"Dog Eat Dog", performed on the night, was removed from the album release, while the encore – "Fling Thing/Rocker" – was edited, removing "Fling Thing" and cutting out Angus's extended solo, as he did a walk around the audience (with an early version of a wireless guitar lead). This part of the band's concert theatrics later accompanied "Let There Be Rock"; "Rocker" has been performed only a few times since Bon Scott's passing in 1980. The live "Dog Eat Dog" was released as the b-side of the single "Whole Lotta Rosie" in November 1978, but only in Australia. It was rereleased worldwide in 2009 on the two (standard) and three (collectors) CD boxed set compilation Backtracks, featuring Australian-only songs not released internationally at the time, and live b-Sides from 7" and 12" singles. The encores "Fling Thing" and "Rocker" (with a complete guitar solo) appeared only on footage of the concert by a Dutch TV station played at the time, but were eventually released on the Family Jewels DVD.

According to the 2006 book AC/DC: Maximum Rock & Roll, the album title was an extension of Scott's response – at the Day on the Green festival in July 1978 – when a journalist asked what they could expect from the band. The singer replied, "Blood." The cover art is from a shoot with Atlantic Records' staff photographer Jim Houghton before a show at Boston's Paradise Theater, the idea for which came from Atlantic's art director Bob Defrin.

A song titled "If You Want Blood (You've Got It)" appeared on the next album: the band's US chart breakthrough, Highway to Hell.

Reception

The album is often considered to be one of the greatest live albums of all time. In a 1992 interview with Metal Hammer at the time of the band's second live release, Malcolm Young admitted, "I personally still prefer the old album. We were young, fresh, vital and kicking ass." Greg Prato of AllMusic notes, "While most other rock bands of the era were busy experimenting with disco or creating studio-perfected epics, AC/DC was one of the few specializing in raw and bluesy hard rock, as evidenced by 1978's live set, If You Want Blood You've Got It." Eduardo Rivadavia of Ultimate Classic Rock enthuses, "Other concert records may boast more songs, more Top 40 hits or even more crowd-pleasing gimmicks. But very few can challenge the sheer excitement and reckless abandon captured on AC/DC’s terrific concert document." The album was listed at #2 on Classic Rock magazine's readers' poll of "50 Greatest Live Albums Ever". Carlo Twist of Blender magazine praised the album, saying that "They were always a mighty live act, and this is the sound of AC/DC in Europe just prior to 1979's U.S. breakthrough. The audience's hysteria regularly cuts through the amps, as they howl along to singer Bon Scott's tale of sexually transmitted disease ("The Jack") and punctuate guitarist Angus Young's staccato riffing on "Whole Lotta Rosie." Imagine a punk-rock Chuck Berry played at nosebleed volume."

Concert footage
The entire Glasgow concert was filmed but the complete footage has never been released. Eventually, "Riff Raff" and "Fling Thing/Rocker" segments were made available on the DVD AC/DC Family Jewels, released in 2005. Video footage was also used from the show on Family Jewels using the "Rock 'n' Roll Damnation" studio version audio track promotional clip. Segments from the concert (the songs "Rock 'n' Roll Damnation", "Dog Eat Dog" and "Let There Be Rock") were made available on the DVD Plug Me In, released in 2007. "Bad Boy Boogie" was included on the bonus disc on the three-disc edition of Plug Me In.

Track listing

Complete concert setlist
All songs written by Young/Young/Scott except "Fling Thing", which they use as a Scottish tradition.

Notes
 The song "Gimme a Bullet" was played during sound-check, according to the Official Apollo Theatre website setlist for the show.
 "Fling Thing" is the b-side to the original Australian only single of "Jailbreak", but is actually the traditional Scottish folk song "The Bonnie Banks o' Loch Lomond". The band played it live in Australia and Scotland as a staple part of the encores in the early years, and is replayed on the 1991 album AC/DC Live 2 CD Collectors edition from the Glasgow concert on the Razors Edge World Tour (though this time it is just called "Bonny") and it was re-released in its original form, for the first time since 1976, on the Backtracks boxed set.
 This version of "Fling Thing / Rocker (reprise)" - as it was the encore for the concert - is on the Family Jewels DVD, with some of the other songs from this concert, but the entire show has never been seen in its entirety since an original broadcast by a Dutch TV station around the same era.

Personnel
Bon Scott – lead vocals
Angus Young – lead guitar
Malcolm Young – rhythm guitar, backing vocals
Cliff Williams – bass guitar, backing vocals
Phil Rudd – drums

Production
Producers: Harry Vanda, George Young
Sound: Mike Scarfe (MHA AUDIO)

Certifications

References

External links
Lyrics on AC/DC's official website

1978 live albums
Albums produced by George Young (rock musician)
Albums produced by Harry Vanda
AC/DC live albums
Atlantic Records live albums